

The Manu Siva Tau is a Samoan war dance, performed by the Samoan sporting teams before each match.

The national rugby union team used to perform the traditional 'Maulu'ulu Moa' on tour. Prior to the 1991 World Cup, the 'Manu' war chant was composed, it was considered to be more effective at psyching up players.

The national Australian rules football team performs the Siva Tau at its International Cup appearances.

In WWE, The Usos, as faces, performed the Siva Tau as part of their ring entrance.

The Toa Samoa national rugby league team also perform the Siva Tau before each match (with the "Toa" replacing "Manu" in the words).

The song "Le Manu" by the New Zealand metal band Shepherds Reign has the lyrics of the Siva Tau as performed by the Manu Samoa.

Words

Alternate versions
During the 2007 Rugby World Cup, the Samoa national rugby union team used a more aggressive version of the Siva Tau. However, this version was dropped by the Manu Samoa before the 2007 Rugby World Cup match against United States in favour of the original version.

This version of the Siva Tau, similar to the version used by the Manu Samoa in the 2007 Rugby World Cup, is used by the Samoa national rugby league team, however, differently from the prior version, the final lines are similar to the Siva Tau performed by the Manu Samoa.

See also

 Haka
 Cibi
 Kailao

References

External links
Manu Samoa Supporters website
Pacific Islanders Rugby Teams supporters website

War dances
Ritual dances
Samoan dances
Samoan words and phrases
Rugby football culture